Anna Bulanova (Cyrillic: Анна Буланова; born 12 May 1994) is a Kyrgyzstani sprinter and long jumper. She represented her country in the 60 metres at the 2012 World Indoor Championships without advancing from the first round.

International competitions

Personal bests
Outdoors
100 metres – 11.55 (-0.1 m/s, Doha 2019)
200 metres – 23.55 (+0.6 m/s, Doha 2019)
Long jump – 6.28 (0.0 m/s, Bishkek 2018)
Indoors
60 metres – 7.45 (Ust-Kamenogorsk 2019)
200 metres – 24.28 (Ust-Kamenogorsk 2019)

References

1994 births
Living people
Kyrgyzstani female sprinters
Athletes (track and field) at the 2018 Asian Games
Asian Games competitors for Kyrgyzstan
Competitors at the 2015 Summer Universiade
Competitors at the 2019 Summer Universiade
20th-century Kyrgyzstani women
21st-century Kyrgyzstani women